Macrozamia pauli-guilielmi is a species of plant in the family Zamiaceae. It is endemic to Australia.

References

Endangered flora of Australia
Flora of Queensland
pauli-guilielmi
Nature Conservation Act endangered biota
Taxonomy articles created by Polbot
Plants described in 1859
Taxa named by Ferdinand von Mueller